Slanted Records is a contemporary Christian record label based in Brentwood, Tennessee. As part of the Spring Hill Music Group, Slanted Records signs Contemporary Christian artists whose music can be described as progressive rock or modern rock. Slanted Records started in 2004 with three bands.

Artists
Current
Decemberadio
Detour 180
Nate Huss
New Endingz ( James, Robert, Caesar, Frankie, Kyle)

Former
After Edmund (Disbanded)
Caleb Rowden (Active, currently unsigned)
Inhabited (Active, currently unsigned)
Jump5 (Disbanded)

See also 

 List of contemporary Christian music record labels
 List of record labels

References

External links 
 

American record labels
Christian record labels
Rock record labels